The 2017 Tuvalu A-Division was the 17th season of top flight association football in Tuvalu. The season started and finish on 2017.

This seventeenth edition of the Tuvalu A-Division marked the end of the Nauti FC title streak, which in 2016 totaled 10 consecutive titles and 11 in total. In addition to the 11 Tuvalu A-Division titles, the Nauti FC team had previously won the Tuvalu League Tournament 11 other times (national league predecessor to the Tuvalu A-Division).

References

External links 
 tnfa.tv
 vriendenvantuvalu.nl 
 soccerway.com

Tuvalu A-Division seasons